The CECAFA U-20 Championship is a football (soccer) tournament in Africa. It is organised by the Council of East and Central Africa Football Associations (CECAFA), and includes national under 20 teams from Central and East Africa.

Past winners

Source:

References

CECAFA competitions